Svelgen or Svelgselva is a river in Bremanger Municipality in Vestland county, Norway. The river originates from the lake Hjelmevatnet, and empties into the Nordgulen fjord at the village of Svelgen. The river is regulated for exploitation of its hydropower.

See also
List of rivers in Norway

References

Rivers of Vestland
Bremanger
Rivers of Norway